State Highway 266 (abbreviated SH-266) is a state highway near Tulsa, Oklahoma, United States. It runs for  through Tulsa and Rogers Counties in northeastern Oklahoma.

Route description
SH-266 begins at a cloverleaf interchange with U.S. Highway 169 (a Tulsa-area freeway), and heads northeast from there to meet the northern terminus of State Highway 167 near the Port of Catoosa (north of the town of Catoosa). Highway 266 arcs to the north to bypass the port, and then straightens out to run due east to Interstate 44 (the Will Rogers Turnpike).

The number 266 refers to U.S. Highway 66 (now State Highway 66, which SH-266 ended at. Highway 266 does not have any lettered spur routes.

Junction list

References

External links
SH-266 at OKHighways

266
Transportation in Tulsa, Oklahoma
Transportation in Tulsa County, Oklahoma
Transportation in Rogers County, Oklahoma